The 2003 Wismilak International was a women's tennis tournament played on outdoor hard courts in Bali, Indonesia that was part of the Tier III category of the 2003 WTA Tour. It was the ninth edition of the tournament and was held from 8 September through 14 September 2003. Second-seeded Elena Dementieva won the singles title and earned $35,000 first-prize money.

Finals

Singles

 Elena Dementieva defeated  Chanda Rubin, 6–2, 6–1
 It was Dementieva's 2nd singles title of the year and of her career.

Doubles

 María Vento-Kabchi /  Angelique Widjaja defeated   Émilie Loit /  Nicole Pratt, 7–5, 6–2

References

External links
 ITF tournament edition details
 Tournament draws

Wismilak International
Commonwealth Bank Tennis Classic
2003 in Indonesian tennis